Ust-Maya (Uus Maaya) is an urban locality (an urban-type settlement) and the administrative center of Ust-Maysky District of the Sakha Republic, Russia, southeast of Yakutsk, the capital of the republic. As of the 2010 Census, its population was 2,293.

Geography
Ust-Maya is located on the north bank of the Aldan River opposite the mouth of the Maya River. The Sette-Daban mountain range rises to the east of the town.

History
Ust-Maya was founded in 1930 as a base for gold mining activities on the Allakh-Yun and Yudoma Rivers to the east. It became the administrative center of the newly created Ust-Maysky District in 1931. During World War II, an airfield was built here for the Alaska-Siberian air route used to ferry American Lend-Lease aircraft to the Eastern Front. In 1957, Ust-Maya was granted urban-type settlement status. In 1972, the administrative center of the district was moved to Solnechny, where it remained until 1992, when it was moved back to Ust-Maya.

Administrative and municipal status
Within the framework of administrative divisions, the urban-type settlement of Ust-Maya serves as the administrative center of Ust-Maysky District. As an administrative division, it is, together with one rural locality (the selo of Ust-Yudoma), incorporated within Ust-Maysky District as the Settlement of Ust-Maya. As a municipal division, the Settlement of Ust-Maya is incorporated within Ust-Maysky Municipal District as Ust-Maya Urban Settlement.

Transportation
There are no year-round roads connecting Ust-Maya with outside world; however, winter roads connect it to Eldikan and Amga.

The Ust-Maya Airport  is located in the selo of Petropavlovsk,  to the southeast.

Climate
Ust-Maya has an extreme subarctic climate (Köppen climate classification Dfd). Precipitation is quite low and is somewhat higher in summer than at other times of the year.

References

Notes

Sources
Official website of the Sakha Republic. Registry of the Administrative-Territorial Divisions of the Sakha Republic. Ust-Maysky District. 

Urban-type settlements in the Sakha Republic